The Cannaregio Canal is one of the main waterways of Venice, Italy.

Landmarks
Palazzo Labia
Palazzo Venier-Manfrin
Palazzo Savorgnan
Palazzo Bonfadini Vivante
Palazzo Testa
Palazzo Surian Bellotto

External links

Cannaregio
Canals in Venice